Parnassius delphius, the banded Apollo, is a high-altitude butterfly which is found in Central Asia. It is a member of the genus Parnassius of the swallowtail family, Papilionidae.

Description

Note: The wing pattern in Parnassius species is inconsistent and the very many subspecies and forms make identification problematic and uncertain. Structural characters derived from the genitalia, wing venation, sphragis and foretibial epiphysis are more, but not entirely reliable. The description given here is a guide only. For an identification key see Ackery P.R. (1975).

Discal markings dull, submarginal band of forewing distinct, hindmarginal spot absent as a rule; ocelli of hindwing bright carmine, hindmarginal spots black, blackish hindmarginal area broad, two bluish-black anal spots, a faint submarginal and narrow marginal band.

Range
Northern Pakistan, Afghanistan, Tajikistan, Kyrgyzstan, Uzbekistan and Kazakhstan.

Status
Widely distributed. Locally common, generally rare. Not known to be threatened. Requires further research. Protected by law in India. Featured in erstwhile USSR Red Data Book as vulnerable.

Subspecies
There are up to 44 subspecies.

See also
Papilionidae
List of butterflies of India
List of butterflies of India (Papilionidae)

References

 
 
 
 
 
 Sakai S., Inaoka S., Toshiaki A., Yamaguchi S., Watanabe Y., (2002) The Parnassiology. The Parnassius Butterflies, A Study in Evolution, Kodansha, Japan.
 Weiss J.-C., (1992) Parnassiinae of the World - Part 2, Sciences Nat, Venette, France.

Insects of Pakistan
Insects of Central Asia
delphius
Butterflies described in 1843